Quintin Lee Borders (born February 7, 1988) is a former American football left tackle for Tampa Bay Buccaneers of the National Football League (NFL).  He was signed by the Buccaneers as an undrafted free agent in 2011. He played college football for Union College.

Early years
Borders attended Bryan Station High School in Lexington, Kentucky. He played left tackle and defensive end. He also played on his high school track team.

College career
Borders was redshirted in 2006 at the University of Colorado.  Borders transferred at the end of his freshman year to Union College in Barbourville Kentucky. He started all four years at Union College anchoring the offensive line.

Professional career

2011 NFL Combine

Tampa Bay Buccaneers
The Tampa Bay Buccaneers waived Borders on July, 2011.

Personal
Borders is the son of Thomas Riley and Phyills Borders.

References

1988 births
Living people
Players of American football from Lexington, Kentucky
American football offensive linemen
Union College (New York) alumni
Tampa Bay Buccaneers players